Johnny Horton is an American veteran professional Table football player who made his debut in 1975. He is a multiple World Champion and has 11 major titles to his credit.

See also
 List of world table football champions

References
 Profile at table-soccer.org
 Profile at FoosWorld.com

Living people
World champions in table football
Year of birth missing (living people)
Place of birth missing (living people)